John Quincy Adams was the president of the United States from 1825 to 1829.

JQA may also refer to:

 JQA, the IATA code for Qaarsut Airport in Greenland
 Japan Quality Assurance Organization, a certification agency in Japan responsible for certifying ISO 39001 standards
 JQA, the NATO country code trigram for Johnston Atoll
 Japan Quidditch Association, a member of the International Quidditch Association
 JQA, a play about the president performed at the Arena Stage in Washington, D.C.
 JQA, a residence hall at the University of Massachusetts Amherst
 JQA, ICAO code for Trans-Jamaican Airlines